Anesthetic is the first solo album by American guitarist Mark Morton, released on March 1, 2019 via Spinefarm.

Background
The album features guest performances by Jacoby Shaddix of Papa Roach, Myles Kennedy of Alter Bridge, Chuck Billy of Testament, Mark Lanegan, Josh Todd of Buckcherry, Alissa White-Gluz of Arch Enemy, the late Chester Bennington of Linkin Park, Jake Oni of Oni and Randy Blythe of Lamb of God. According to Morton, he had been writing new material for his solo record for "quite some time".

Sound and composition
Mark Morton outlined the difference between his solo album and his work with Lamb of God:

Release
The first single, "The Truth Is Dead", was released on December 13, 2018, premiering on Sirius XM Liquid Metal. The song features Morton's Lamb of God bandmate Randy Blythe and Arch Enemy frontwoman Alissa White-Gluz on vocals. 

The second single off the record, "Cross Off", which features Chester Bennington, debuted at number 18 on the US Billboard Hard Rock Digital Song Sales with 2,000 downloads and 209,000 streams in its first week. A music video for "Cross Off" was released on March 5, directed by Roboshobo. The music video for "Cross Out" features an empty microphone as a tribute to Bennington, who died in 2017.

Reception
Wall of Sound gave the album a 7/10 and stated: "On the one hand he has nabbed some great artists to assist him get this album a release, however I think he has missed the mark on half the tracks by playing along with the Lamb of God playbook too often."

Track listing

Personnel

Mark Morton – guitars , bass , vocals 
Additional vocalists
Chester Bennington – vocals 
Jacoby Shaddix – vocals 
Mark Lanegan – vocals 
Chuck Billy – vocals 
Jake Oni – vocals 
Myles Kennedy – vocals , backing vocals 
Mark Morales – vocals , backing vocals 
Josh Todd – vocals 
Naeemah Maddox – vocals 
Randy Blythe – vocals 
Alissa White-Gluz – vocals 

Additional instrumentalists
Paolo Gregoletto – bass 
Alex Bent – drums 
Marc Ford – guitars 
Mike Inez – bass 
Steve Gorman – drums 
David Ellefson – bass 
Roy Mayorga – drums 
Ray Luzier – drums 
Yanni Papadopoulos – bass 
Jean-Paul Gaster – drums 
Chris Brooks – keyboards 

Production
Josh Wilbur – producer, engineering, mixing
Mark Morton – producer 
Jake Oni – executive producer
Jay Robbins – engineering 
Paul Suarez – engineering 
Roy Mayorga – engineering 
Brad Blackwood – mastering
Daniel Danger – artwork, art direction

Charts

References

External links
 Anesthetic on Mark Morton's official website

2019 albums
Mark Morton (musician) albums
Spinefarm Records albums